Rawlinsius papillatus is a species of beetle in the family Carabidae, the only species in the genus Rawlinsius.

References

Broscinae
Monotypic Carabidae genera